Casoria is a comune (municipality) in the Metropolitan City of Naples in the Italian region Campania, located about  northeast of Naples.

Casoria borders the following municipalities: Afragola, Arzano, Cardito, Casalnuovo di Napoli, Casavatore, Frattamaggiore, Naples, Volla.

History
The name of Casoria is mentioned for the first time in documents from 993 to 998, connected to the casa aurea raviosa (Italian: "Casa d'Oro di Raviosa", in English: "Golden House of Raviosa") mentioned in other documents from 952 to 988.  However, numerous findings have proven that the territory was inhabited several centuries BCE.

The village of Casoria developed after the year 1000 AD, thanks to the Benedictine monastery of San Gregorio Armeno of Naples. In the 13th century it was a fief of the archbishop of Naples. In 1580 it was acquired by the Royal Estate of the Kingdom of Naples. In 1815 it was made capital of a circondario of the Kingdom of the Two Sicilies, including 19 communes.

Its marshy territory was reclaimed in the same period, becoming one of the most fertile areas in the region. Until the 1950s, Casoria was an agricultural center, also producing pasta and wine, as well as cannabis handicrafts. Its industrial development, during which it became the main industrial hub in southern Italy, caused the population to increase by four times from 1951 to 1991. Most of the industries have disappeared now.

In 2005 the communal council was dissolved due to camorra connections of its members.

References

External links
 Official website

Cities and towns in Campania